Gibbons Mansion, currently known as Mead Hall, is a historical mansion on Drew University campus in Madison, Morris County, New Jersey, United States. It houses the university's administrative offices today.

History
It was built by William Gibbons beginning in 1833 in the heart of his 96-acre property; it was first occupied in 1836.  Gibbons was the son of Thomas Gibbons, a prominent politician, lawyer and steamboat operator originally from the South.  Gibbons’ only son, William Heyward Gibbons, sold the vacant mansion and estate to Daniel Drew in 1867 for $140,000. Drew, in turn, the Drew Theological Seminary, named in his honor. The Gibbons mansion was renamed Mead Hall, in honor of Drew's wife, Roxanna Mead. The sister of William Heyward Gibbons, Sarah Taintor Gibbons, was Mrs. Ward McAllister.

1989 fire
Mead Hall was devastated by a fire in 1989, reopened in 1993, and despite the damage, is still “considered the finest example of Greek Revival architecture north of the Mason-Dixon line."

See also
Drew University

References

Drew University
Houses completed in 1836
Houses in Morris County, New Jersey
National Register of Historic Places in Morris County, New Jersey
New Jersey Register of Historic Places
Madison, New Jersey